Mirko Mulalić (born April 16, 1988) is a Slovenian professional basketball player who play for Cedevita Olimpija of the Slovenian League and the ABA League.

Professional career
In July 2007, he signed a one-year deal with Union Olimpija. In August 2014, he signed with another Slovenian team BC Krka.

On January 31, 2022, he signed with Cedevita Olimpija of the Slovenian League.

References

External links
 ABA Liga 
 basketball.realgm.com 
 svet24.si

1988 births
Living people
ABA League players
Alba Fehérvár players
BC Balkan Botevgrad players
KK Cedevita Olimpija players
KK Krka players
KK Olimpija players
KK Rabotnički players
Shooting guards
Slovenian expatriate sportspeople in Bulgaria
Slovenian expatriate sportspeople in Hungary
Slovenian expatriate sportspeople in North Macedonia
Slovenian men's basketball players
Basketball players from Ljubljana